Batopilas may refer to:

 Batopilas, Chihuahua, a town in the state of Chihuahua, Mexico, and seat of Batopilas Municipality
 Batopilas Municipality, a municipality in the state of Chihuahua, Mexico 
 Batopilas River